Abacetus rufinus is a species of ground beetle in the subfamily Pterostichinae. It was described by Straneo in 1943.

References

rufinus
Beetles described in 1943